So Much Fun is the debut studio album by American rapper Young Thug. It was released on August 16, 2019, by YSL Records, 300 Entertainment and Atlantic Records. The album features guest appearances from Future, Machine Gun Kelly, Gunna, Lil Baby, Lil Uzi Vert, Lil Duke, 21 Savage, Doe Boy, Lil Keed, Quavo, Juice Wrld, Nav, J. Cole, and Travis Scott. The album was supported by the singles "The London" and "Hot".

So Much Fun received generally positive reviews and debuted atop the US Billboard 200, becoming Young Thug's first US number-one album.

Production
American musician J. Cole was originally rumored, without any official confirmation from Cole nor Thug, to serve as the executive producer on the album, but his contributions did not make it to the final album. Among others, Thug worked with Roddy Ricch, 21 Savage, and Gunna in recording sessions for the album.

Release and promotion
So Much Fun was originally titled GOLDMOUFDOG (stylized as GØŁDMØÜFDÖG) before Young Thug revealed the new title in an interview with podcast host Adam22 for his No Jumper channel. Thug also announced the album's title had been changed on social media. On August 10, 2019, Thug announced the album would be released on August 16. The deluxe edition of the album was released on December 20, 2019, featuring five new tracks: "Diamonds", "Hop Off a Jet", "Die Today", "Millions", and the remix of "Hot".

Singles
The album's lead single, "The London" featuring J. Cole and Travis Scott, was released on May 23, 2019. The song was produced by T-Minus. It peaked at number 12 on the US Billboard Hot 100. The second single, "Hot" featuring Gunna, was released in a remix additionally featuring Travis Scott on October 31, 2019. It peaked at number 11 on the Billboard Hot 100.

Artwork
The album's artwork features 803 posed Young Thugs used in order to form the rapper's face.

Critical reception

So Much Fun was met with generally positive reviews. At Metacritic, which assigns a normalized rating out of 100 to reviews from professional publications, the album received an average score of 79, based on 10 reviews. Aggregator AnyDecentMusic? gave it 7.3 out of 10, based on their assessment of the critical consensus.

Alphonse Pierre of Pitchfork gave a positive review, stating "Despite all the collaborations on So Much Fun, the album is about Young Thug. He might not mystify as he did in the early stages of his career, when he was stumbling into new flows and deliveries at an inhuman pace, but now he's able to wield the madness with ease, satisfying in many modes". Scott Glaysher of HipHopDX wrote that "Thugger has performed vocally like this before on Jeffrey, lyrically like this on Slime Season and emotionally like this on Beautiful Thugger Girls but not consistently have they all converged together like this, forging the ultimate Young Thug Voltron. Plus, this top-notch performance has been spread across such perfectly paced beats. Quite literally, the production on this album is just a blast". Jacob Carey of Exclaim! said, "Although it may not be the best project that Young Thug has released, certain tracks off So Much Fun are guaranteed to become classic party anthems played at max volume for years". Kyann-Sian Williams of NME stated, "So Much Fun is a free-spirited record that comes with heavy doses of ridiculousness, but it's lovably silly, and is a welcome dose of light relief". Lucy Shanker of Consequence claimed, "So Much Fun succeeds in its quest to highlight the success of Young Thug; almost all of the 19 tracks could stand alone as a strong demonstration of what Thug does best, but they also work together to create a cohesive project". Magazine publication Spin said, "Some classic records have been made in this mold; plenty of dull ones, too. So Much Fun is somewhere in the middle, with a handful of legitimately great songs, only a couple you may end up skipping, and none that sound like someone forgot to send them to the mastering engineer".

Rolling Stones critic Danny Schwartz said, "So Much Fun doesn't mark a step forward for his aesthetic, but rather an attempt to refine it". In a mixed review, RapReviewss Steve "Flash" Juon stated: "You can't examine Young Thug's music too closely or think about it too carefully if you want to enjoy it, because the casual misogyny of throwing around "Pussy" as an insult reminds you he's not exactly progressive. If you're looking for bass to shake the concrete and singing so modulated as to nearly be R&B, tracks like "Jumped Out the Window" and "Boy Back" featuring NAV will definitely fit the bill." In his Substack-published "Consumer Guide" column, Robert Christgau said that, "In alphabetical order, it's alienated, all-embracing, catchy, complacent, crass, dirty, dissolute, facile, fucked up, funny, hedonistic, insular, licentious, light-hearted, materialistic, mumbly, rich, scared, sexist, 'trap', unpretentious, woozy, and wrong. Almost a decade in, I do enjoy and even respect the fella. But I don't admire him. Not enough there there".

Year-end lists

Industry awards

Commercial performance
So Much Fun debuted at number one on the US Billboard 200 with 131,000 album-equivalent units (including 5,000 pure album sales). It is Young Thug's first US number-one album, and fifth to place in the top 10 (or sixth, if the 2018 compilation Slime Language is counted). On June 29, 2020, the album was certified platinum by the Recording Industry Association of America (RIAA) for combined sales and album-equivalent units of over one million units in the United States.

Track listing

Notes
  signifies an additional producer
 Upon the album's initial release, "Ecstasy" did not feature vocals by Machine Gun Kelly.

Personnel
Credits adapted from Geoff Ogunlesi's Instagram.

 A. Bainz – recording (tracks 1–7, 10, 12–18), mixing (tracks 1–18)
 Florian "Flo" Ongonga – recording (tracks 2, 8, 11, 12, 17)
 Fxxxy – recording (track 2)
 Jenso "JP" Plymouth – recording (track 3)
 Shaan Singh – recording (tracks 9, 13, 16), engineering assistant (track 10), mixing (tracks 1–18), engineering (track 19)
 Andrew "Pro Logic" Franklin – recording (track 18)
 Gosha Usov – recording (track 19)
 Alex Tumay – mixing (tracks 1–19)
 Jimmy Cash – additional mixing (track 19)
 Joe LaPorta – mastering (tracks 1–19)

Charts

Weekly charts

Year-end charts

Certifications

Release history

References

2019 debut albums
Young Thug albums
Albums produced by DJ Mustard
Albums produced by J. Cole
Albums produced by Southside (record producer)
Albums produced by T-Minus (record producer)
Albums produced by Pi'erre Bourne
Atlantic Records albums
YSL Records albums
Trap music albums